This Is the Remix is the first remix album by American recording artist 
Jessica Simpson, released on July 2, 2002, by Columbia Records. The album contains remixes of tracks from her first two studio albums Sweet Kisses (1999) and Irresistible (2001). The remixes were done by DJs such as Peter Rauhofer and Hex Hector. The music was influenced by various genres of electronic music, such as ambient and techno. This Is the Remix did not include any new recordings.

The album charted at number eighteen on Billboard's Top Electronic Albums Chart.

Background
On April 15, 2002, Columbia Records announced through a press release that Simpson  would release a remix album titled This Is the Remix. The album includes songs from her previous albums remixed by DJs such as Peter Rauhofer and Hex Hector. So So Def Recordings was responsible for the remix of "Irresistible." The So So Def remix of the track, produced by Jermaine Dupri, features guest appearances by rapper Lil' Bow Wow and Dupri.

Commercial performance
In the United States, the album charted at number eighteen on US Billboard Dance/Electronic Albums chart.

Track listing

Personnel
Adapted from the This Is The Remix liner notes.
Phil Tan – mixing
Guido Osorio – remix producer
Soul Solutiono – remix producer
Peter Rauhofer – producer, remix producer
Hex Hector – producer, remixing
Lenny Bertoldo – producer, remixing
Bow Wow – performer
Bryan-Michael Cox – remixing
Theresa LaBarbera Whites – A&R
Jermaine Dupri – remixing, mixing
Brian Frye – engineer

Charts

References

Jessica Simpson albums
2002 remix albums
Albums produced by Jermaine Dupri
Albums produced by Sam Watters
Columbia Records remix albums
Trance remix albums